The White Steed is a play in three acts written in 1939 by Paul Vincent Carroll. It won the 1939 New York Drama Critics' Circle award for Best Foreign Play.

Setting
The setting of the play is the present-day village of Lorcan, County Louth, Ireland.

Original cast
The show was performed at the Cort Theatre and then moved to the John Golden Theatre. It ran all together for 136 performances. It was staged by Hugh Hunt, scenic design by Watson Barratt, general manager was Saul Abraham, and produced by Eddie Dowling.

Florence Barratt as Meg Megee
Leslie Bingham as Rosieanne
Roland Bottomley as Donnacaidh McGoilla Phadraig 
George Coulouris as Father Shaughnessy
Ralph Cullinan as Phelim Fintry 
Thomas P. Dillon as Inspector Toomey
Barry Fitzgerald as Canon Matt Lavelle 
Elizabeth Malone as Brigid Brodigan
Grace Mills as Sarah Hearty 
Farrell Pelly as Patrick Hearty 
Liam Redmond as Denis Dillon
Jessica Tandy as Nora Fintry
Tom Tully as  Michael Shivers

Later performances
The White Steed was presented on the televised series Play of the Week in 1959.

References
At the Internet Broadway Data Base

1939 plays